The Canada women's national under-21 field hockey team represents Canada in international under-21 field hockey competitions. The team is controlled by the governing body for field hockey in Canada, Field Hockey Canada, which is a member of the Pan American Hockey Federation (PAHF) and the International Hockey Federation (FIH).

The team's first recorded appearance was at the 1989 FIH World Cup, where the team finished in seventh place.

The team's last appearance was in 2021, during the Pan American Junior Championship in Santiago, where the team claimed an historic gold medal.

Tournament records

Current squad
The following 18 players represented Canada at the 2021 Pan American Junior Championship in Santiago.

Caps and goals updated as of August 28, 2021, after the match against Uruguay.

References

External links

FIH profile

Women's national under-21 field hockey teams
Field hockey
National team